The Pensacola Mountains are a large group of mountain ranges of the Transantarctic Mountains System, located in the Queen Elizabeth Land region of Antarctica.

Geography
They extend 450 km (280 mi) in a NE-SW direction.  Subranges of the Pensacola Mountains include: Argentina Range, Forrestal Range, Dufek Massif, Cordiner Peaks, Neptune Range, Patuxent Range, Rambo Nunataks and Pecora Escarpment. These mountain units lie astride the extensive Foundation Ice Stream and Support Force Glacier which drain northward to the Ronne Ice Shelf.

Naming
Discovered and photographed on 13 January 1956 in the course of a transcontinental nonstop plane flight by personnel of United States Navy Operation Deep Freeze I from McMurdo Sound to Weddell Sea and return. Named by US-ACAN for the U.S. Naval Air Station, Pensacola, Florida, in commemoration of the historic role of that establishment in training aviators of the U.S. Navy. The mountains were mapped in detail by USGS from surveys and US Navy air photos, 1956–67.

Geology
The Pensacola Mountains were originally continuous with the Ventana Mountains near Bahía Blanca in Argentina, Cape Fold Belt in South Africa, the Ellsworth Mountains (West Antarctica) and the Hunter-Bowen orogeny in eastern Australia.

The Ordovician-Devonian Neptune Group rests unconformably on a Cambrian succession, and is overlain disconformably by the Dover Sandstone of the Beacon Supergroup.  Within the Neptune Group is the Brown Ridge Conglomerate, Elliott Sandstone, Elbow Formation, and the Heiser Sandstone.

Features
Geographical features include:

Neptune Range

Williams Hills

Schmidt Hills

Other features

Forrestal Range

Patuxent Range

Anderson Hills

Thomas Hills

Other features

Argentina Range

Schneider Hills

Panzarini Hills

Other features

Cordiner Peaks

Rambo Nunataks

Pecora Escarpment

Dufek Massif

Boyd Escarpment

Other features

Other Pensacola Mountains features

 Academy Glacier
 Edge Rocks
 Ferrell Nunatak
 Ford Massif
 Himmelberg Hills
 Iroquois Plateau
 Kester Peaks
 Taylor Nunatak

Further reading 
 Gunter Faure, Teresa M. Mensing, The Transantarctic Mountains: Rocks, Ice, Meteorites and Water, P 233
 M.J.Bentley, A.S.Hein, D.E.Sugden, P.L.Whitehouse, R.Shanks, S.Xu, S.P.H.T.Freeman, Deglacial history of the Pensacola Mountains, Antarctica from glacial geomorphology and cosmogenic nuclide surface exposure dating, Quaternary Science Reviews Volume 158, 15 February 2017, Pages 58–76, https://doi.org/10.1016/j.quascirev.2016.09.028
 JOHN C. BEHRENDT, JOHN R. HENDERSON, LAURENT ElSTER, and WILLIAM L. RAMBO, Geophysical Investigations of the Pensacola Mountains and Adjacent Glacierized Areas of Antarctica, GEOLOGICAL SURVEY PROFESSIONAL PAPER 844
 Curtis, M. (2002), Palaeozoic to Mesozoic polyphase deformation of the Patuxent Range, Pensacola Mountains, Antarctica, Antarctic Science, 14(2), 175–183. https://doi:10.1017/S0954102002000743
 Myrl E. Beck, Palaeomagnetism and Magnetic Polarity Zones in the Jurassic Dufek Intrusion, Pensacola Mountains, Antarctica, Geophysical Journal International, Volume 28, Issue 1, May 1972, Pages 49–63, https://doi.org/10.1111/j.1365-246X.1972.tb06110.x
 Hodgson, Dominic A Bentley, Michael J, Lake highstands in the Pensacola Mountains and Shackleton Range 4300–2250 cal. yr BP: Evidence of a warm climate anomaly in the interior of Antarctica, https://doi.org/10.1177/0959683612460790
 Karolien Peeters (UGent), Dominic A Hodgson, Peter Convey and Anne Willems (UGent), Culturable diversity of heterotrophic bacteria in Forlidas Pond (Pensacola Mountains) and Lundström Lake (Shackleton Range), Antarctica, (2011) MICROBIAL ECOLOGY. 62(2). p. 399-413

References 

 
Mountain ranges of Queen Elizabeth Land
Transantarctic Mountains